Quentin Durward is an 1823 novel by Sir Walter Scott.

Quentin Durward may also refer to:

 Quentin Durward (TV series), a French-German TV series
 PS Quentin Durward (1823), an 1823 paddle-wheel steamer
 The Adventures of Quentin Durward, a 1955 British-American film

See also
 Quentin Durward Corley (1884–1980), American judge and inventor